For the original WAKY in Louisville, see WKRD (AM).

WAKY-FM (103.5 FM) is a radio station licensed to Radcliff, Kentucky, United States, and serving the Louisville, Kentucky area. The station is currently owned by W & B Broadcasting, Inc. The station's studios are located in Elizabethtown, Kentucky. They are also known to broadcast UK Football and Basketball games during the fall and winter months. WAKY-FM is also simulcast on WAKY-AM (620 AM), and FM translators W261CO (100.1 FM) and 106.3 W292FS (106.3 FM) in Louisville. 100.1 W261CO serves Louisville inside the Interstate 264 (Watterson/Shawnee Expressway) corridor (along with New Albany, Clarksville, and Jeffersonville in Southern Indiana), while 106.3 W292FS serves Jeffersontown and Lake Forest.

History
The station went on the air as WUOX on November 1, 1991. On October 30, 1992, the station changed its call sign to WLVK, on July 17, 1995, to WASE, on May 11, 2007, to WAKY, and on December 3, 2014, to the current WAKY-FM.

The WAKY calls and oldies format the station airs are an homage to Louisville's WAKY AM 790, a legendary and popular Top 40 music station from the late 1950s to the late 1970s. The original WAKY had its own stint as an oldies station from 1982 to 1986 and is now WKRD. Prior to adopting the WAKY calls, 103.5 FM also played oldies as WASE "Kool 103.5."

Since former competitor WRKA 103.1 FM dropped its classic hits format in favor of contemporary country music, WAKY-FM is now the only rock oldies station in the Louisville market.

References

External links
Tribute site in remembrance of the original WAKY-AM 

AKY-FM
AKY-FM
Classic hits radio stations in the United States
Radio stations established in 1991
1991 establishments in Kentucky
Hardin County, Kentucky